This is a list of French football transfers for the 2009 summer transfer window. The summer transfer window opened on 1 July 2009 and closed midnight on 1 September 2009. Only moves involving Ligue 1 and Ligue 2 clubs are listed. Players without a club may join one at any time, either during or in between transfer windows.

Transfers

 Player who signed with club before 1 July officially joined his new club on 1 July 2009, while player who joined after 1 July joined his new club following his signature of the contract.

Notes and references

French
Transfers Summer 2009
2009